Allan William Stewart (born 21 January 1977 in Coventry, England) is an English musician. He is the second guitarist in Idlewild, the bassist in Holy Mountain and guitarist for the band Desalvo. He grew up in Farnborough, Hampshire.

Stewart joined Idlewild as a touring guitarist in 2000 and became a full member in 2003. He features on the Idlewild albums Warnings/Promises, Make Another World and Post Electric Blues, of which, on the latter he is also pictured on the cover. He co-wrote "I Never Wanted" on The Remote Part. 

Following Idlewild's hiatus in 2010, Stewart joined Glasgow band Holy Mountain with Pete Flett (drums) and Andy McGlone (vocals). Stewart also commenced work as a guitar, bass and drum tech for many popular touring bands such as Mogwai, The Jesus & Mary Chain, Franz Ferdinand, Primal Scream, Belle & Sebastian and Icelandic band, Of Monsters and Men. 

In 2019, Stewart once again took up touring guitarist duties for Idlewild whom he continues to perform with. He continues to reside in Glasgow, Scotland, U.K. with his partner.

References

1977 births
Living people
English rock guitarists
English male guitarists
English rock bass guitarists
Male bass guitarists
21st-century bass guitarists
21st-century British male musicians